Woodway may refer to:
Woodway, Virginia
 Woodway, Washington
 Woodway, Texas